Doctor Nefarious is a fictional character and the most prominent antagonist in Insomniac Games' Ratchet & Clank video game series.

In the series, Dr. Nefarious is a robotic mad scientist and supervillain with a deep, distinct hatred for organic lifeforms. He is depicted as the arch-nemesis  of Captain Qwark and later of the duo Ratchet and Clank. Throughout the series, Nefarious is always accompanied by his loyal robotic butler, Lawrence, who often proves to be much more shrewd than his pompous master. He has a famous trademark gag of that whenever he loses his temper or is put under extreme stress, Nefarious instantly malfunctions and freezes up, while radio waves of episodes from the fictional soap opera series Lance and Janice are broadcast through his mind, until he is whacked behind the head by Lawrence or someone else.

Fictional character biography

Most of what is known about Doctor Nefarious' past comes from the less-than-reliable Qwark vid-comics featured in Ratchet & Clank: Up Your Arsenal. Originally an organic humanoid with an abnormally large head, Dr. Nefarious first appeared in a vid-comic where, angry and embittered against those who had belittled him for his deformed appearance, he created an army of mutant Amoeboids to infest and destroy Blackwater City on planet Rilgar. After fending off the Amoeboids, superhero Captain Qwark traced Nefarious to a secret robot factory on planet Magmos and confronted the villain on the catwalk. Qwark quickly recognized Nefarious as one of the students he bullied and humiliated in high school. Qwark then attempted to give Nefarious a wedgie "for old times' sake", before he accidentally knocked the doctor over the catwalk and into the machinery below, which ultimately led to his transformation into a robot. Driven insane by the experience, Nefarious soon resurfaced and unleashed a swarm of robotic insects on the city of Metropolis on planet Kerwan to get revenge on Qwark, who confronted and defeated him again; Nefarious' body was badly damaged and all that was left of the villain was his disembodied head, which Qwark dumped in a trash can intending to get rid of him for good. Qwark was subsequently knocked out by Nefarious' butler, Lawrence, and taken to the former's ice planet lab. Qwark managed to escape while Nefarious began planning his vendetta while his body was repaired; however, the hasty repairs left Nefarious with a habit of malfunctioning in times of extreme stress (during which he freezes up and receives random radio signals of a holo-vision soap opera series, Lance and Janice, in his head) until being whacked by Lawrence or any of his allies.

While Nefarious is neither seen nor mentioned, his Amoeboids appear in Blackwater City on Rilgar in the original Ratchet & Clank. This suggests that he was involved in or aware of the plans of Chairman Drek, an idea that is later hinted at in Ratchet & Clank Future: A Crack in Time and Ratchet & Clank: All 4 One when Lawrence and Nefarious both mention the Blarg. This would also explain his inclusion as the main antagonist in the Ratchet & Clank remake and tie-in film.

In Ratchet & Clank: Up Your Arsenal, Dr. Nefarious resurfaces once again, this time forming an alliance with a race of primitive aliens called Tyhrranoids and arming them with advanced technology and even secretly recruiting the robot popstar sensation Courtney Gears to put subliminal anti-organic messages in her videos. He then started a campaign to exterminate all organic lifeforms in the Solana Galaxy planet by planet. Nefarious then creates and unleashes the "Biobliterator", a superweapon that turns all organic lifeforms into robots so that he can unify the galaxy under his "benevolent, iron-fisted rule" and usher in the new "Age of Robots". He also attempts to convince Clank to join his cause, being a big fan of the small robot's appearances in the "Secret Agent Clank" holo-vision show, of which he owns a copy of every episode as he mistakenly believes that the show is real. When Clank refuses, Nefarious captures and replaces him with a look-alike doppelgänger whom he names Klunk. Eventually, Ratchet defeats Klunk and rescues Clank. The duo travel to planet Koros and destroys the first Biobliterator with an ion cannon. Nefarious then reveals he has a secondary Biobliterator ready and waiting on planet Mylon; this one is capable of transforming into a giant robot which Nefarious himself pilots. Ratchet and Clank manage to destroy it with the aid of Captain Qwark, forcing Nefarious and Lawrence to teleport away to safety. In his haste to avoid getting blown up, however, Nefarious doesn't bother to specify an exact destination and they both end up stranded on a drifting asteroid in deep space for between "5 or 10,000 years," as Lawrence puts it, until they can come within range of another planet.
	
Nefarious makes a cameo appearance in Ratchet: Deadlocked alongside Lawrence, both still stuck on the asteroid as they pass by the just-destroyed ruins of the DreadZone Station. Enraged at his dashed hopes of rescue, Nefarious takes his anger out on Lawrence only to freeze up again. In Ratchet & Clank Future: Tools of Destruction, Nefarious's wallet can be found at the Imperial Fight Festival on planet Mukow as lost property, hinting at his presence in Emperor Tachyon's audience. It is later revealed that Space Pirates spotted them (but decided not to rescue them) when Nefarious was infuriated by Lawrence again and was in the middle of screaming at his butler when his trademark malfunction occurred.

Dr. Nefarious later returns as the main antagonist in Ratchet & Clank: A Crack in Time (which is foreshadowed in the ending of  Ratchet & Clank Future: Quest for Booty). He and Lawrence remained trapped on the asteroid until drifted into the Polaris Galaxy. Having crash-landed on the planet Zanifar and gained the trust of the local Fongoids, Nefarious reviews his past plans trying to comprehend how they have always failed, before learning of the existence of the Great Clock and devising a plan to use it to alter history so that villains always triumph over heroes (unaware of the fact that his plan would result in the entire Universe's destruction). Nefarious uses his trust with the Fongoids to have them build a fortress for himself, then summons and traps the creator of the Great Clock, Orvus, to extract information from him regarding the Clock's operation. Though Orvus remains defiant and escapes, Nefarious learns that Clank is the key to accessing the Clock.
 
Two years later (when the game takes place), Nefarious moves from his fortress to a large space station crafted in the image of his head and begins a campaign to terrorize the Polaris Galaxy into submitting to his rule with aid from the mercenary Lord Vorselon and the robotic Valkyries. His plans to harness the Great Clock have not abated, and he orders Lawrence to observe Clank in secret from within the Clock. After Clank opens the Orvus Chamber, Lawrence knocks him out and reports the news to Nefarious. The doctor then gleefully starts "Unnecessarily Evil Initiative Omega-91" by using Clank as bait to lure Ratchet into a Valkyrie ambush. With "help" from Captain Qwark, Ratchet and Clank reunite and infiltrate Nefarious' space station to destroy his fleet of ships, but are then captured and brought before Nefarious. After explaining the full extent of his plans, Nefarious ejects the two heroes with his "Asteroid Flinger 5000" (installed in the case that he needs an ironic death scenario for his enemies). After surviving a crash landing on planet Morklon and going back in time to help the Fongoids win the Battle of Gimlick Valley, Ratchet and Clank commandeer a ship back to the space station and stop Nefarious from boarding his last remaining ship to the Great Clock. In the end, Dr. Nefarious is again defeated by Ratchet and Clank and falls screaming to his ship's surface. Upon landing, he suffers a complete system breakdown (characterized by random music signals and dancing) before his ship crashes into the space station and destroys it. Though Ratchet and Clank escape in time with aid from General Azimuth, it is reported during the credits that Nefarious's body was not found in the wreckage. In the Ratchet & Clank comic series and All 4 One, Qwark confirms that Lawrence teleported Nefarious away in time and that he is still considered to be within the Polaris System.
 	
Doctor Nefarious is a playable character in the game Ratchet & Clank: All 4 One, where he initially triggers the plot by tricking Qwark into fighting a giant Light-eating Z'Grute only to be attacked by his own creature. When Ratchet and Clank try to stop it, they, Qwark, and Nefarious are all captured by the Creature Collector Ephemeris, and the villainous robot is forced to work with the heroes to escape. Despite his dislike of his "partners", Nefarious slowly warms up to playing the hero, even going so far as to save Qwark on a few occasions. In the end, Nefarious reasserts his role as a supervillain and escapes, though a final scene hints that he may not have been completely ungrateful for his temporary friends. Nefarious appears as an downloadable skin in Ratchet & Clank: Full Frontal Assault. 

Outside of the Ratchet and Clank series, Nefarious cameos in the San Francisco level of PlayStation All-Stars Battle Royale, and was originally planned as a playable character alongside Ratchet and Clank. Nefarious also appeared as an unlockable Chibi-sized Minion in a patch for the game.

In Ratchet & Clank: Rift Apart, After many years of defeats, Nefarious went into hiding for a long period of time while Ratchet and Clank assumed he retired from villainy, but in reality, Nefarious was fed up losing time and time again that he planned to travel to another dimension where he always wins. After many years of searching, he found coordinates to a dimension then planned to use the Dimensionator from the Festival of Heroes and he discovered the existence of a parallel universe where he's the emperor. He subsequently forms an alliance with his alternate counterpart (voiced by Robin Atkin Downes) to invade and conquer all other realities but he ultimately ends up turning on the emperor after he decides to invade his home dimension delivering the final blow in his defeat. During the credits, he is seen reuniting with Lawrence who is revealed to be married and his firstborn child.

Reimagined Series

Nefarious appears in the Ratchet & Clank film and accompanying video game. Here, he is depicted in an organic form, having not yet undergone his robotic conversion, acting as Chairman Drek's chief scientist. Instead of appearing as he did in Up Your Arsenal before turning into a robot, Doctor Nefarious has green skin with pointy ears, wears glasses, and physically resembles his later robot form. It is stated in the film that Nefarious was originally a founding member of the Galactic Rangers before he turned evil, working as the Rangers' support team before Elaris; he turned to villainy out of anger for Qwark taking all the credit for Nefarious' work and inventions and refusing to treat him as an equal. It is also stated that Nefarious' first major crime was an attempt to "atomize" Aleero City, resulting in Qwark defeating and incarcerating him before the doctor is presumably killed in a failed prison break. Nefarious subsequently partners with Drek to create a superweapon known as the "Deplanitizer" to enable Drek to destroy other planets and harvest suitable remains for the creation of a new planet to replace his own over-polluted homeworld. Nefarious ensured that the target list included Umbris, an uninhabited planet with a core of pure moluvium that he knew would detonate once struck by the Deplanetizer, resulting in the Solana system being completely wiped out due to a rare orbital convergence and, Nefarious hoped, resulting in the Rangers being forcibly disbanded and ruined for failing to prevent the disaster. To ensure the success of his plans, he turns Drek into a sheep using the Sheepinator, one of his favorite weapons, and assuming direct control of the Deplanetizer. Nefarious also creates a weapon nicknamed the RYNO (Rip You a New One), the most powerful weapon in the galaxy, which causes him to be struck by an energy blast when Ratchet hits him near the end of the film, causing him to disintegrate as he plummets to his death. In a post-credits scene, Nefarious is shown to have survived the disintegration, albeit with near-fatal injuries, before a few of his own repairbots searching the Deplanetizer's wreckage for survivors find and convert him into a robot to save his life. The game, meanwhile, is more concrete, apparently killing Nefarious by having him vaporized within a dwarf star. However, since the story is narrated by Qwark, it is likely that he survived without his knowledge.

He was the main antagonist of the Ratchet and Clank animated short Life Of Pie, where he builds a Portalizer (similar to the Dimensionator) to travel through other dimensions but it gets stolen by Ratchet and Clank.

Reception
Johnny Liu of Game Revolution said that "Doctor Nefarious' psychotic babbling [...] strikes the right balance between threatening and comical". He was included in GameSpot's "All Time Greatest Video Game Villain" contest and reached the "Round 1a" before losing to Dr. Wily. Dr. Nefarious was listed as the sixth best videogame villain on PS3 by PlayStation Official Magazine. IGN ranked him 65th on their list of "The Top 100 Videogame Villains", saying "he is evil, but evil in the most loveable way" and that "one of Dr. Nefarious' most charming quirks is his tendency to blow a fuse and stop mid-sentence, occasionally picking up soap opera radio waves in the process when he is under stress" (especially since it's always a Lance and Janice episode). GamesRadar listed Nefarious as one of "Gaming's maddest mad doctors". He was ranked seventh in the "Top Ten A.I. Characters of the Decade" article by Matt Miller from Game Informer, who wrote "Dr. Nefarious is just the villain that this sci-fi series needed. [...] A great villain can make a story, and Nefarious hits all the right notes to fit the franchise."

References

Further reading

Dictator characters in video games
Extraterrestrial characters in video games
Extraterrestrial supervillains
Fictional dictators
Fictional extraterrestrial robots
Fictional henchmen in video games
Fictional inventors in video games
Mad scientist characters in video games
Male characters in video games
Ratchet & Clank characters
Robot characters in video games
Robot supervillains
Sony Interactive Entertainment antagonists
Video game bosses
Video game characters introduced in 2004